Jess Kennedy (born 12 July 1990) is an Australian rules footballer who played for the Carlton Football Club in the AFL Women's competition (AFLW).
She was recruited by Carlton as a free agent following the 2016 AFL Women's draft. She made her debut in Round 1, 2017, in the club and the league's inaugural match at Ikon Park against . Kennedy finished 2017 having played in four matches with Carlton. She was subsequently delisted at season's end.

Kennedy joined Richmond's VFL Women's side for its first season in 2018 and was named the club's first women's team captain. She won the inaugural best and fairest award that season.

References

External links

Living people
1990 births
Carlton Football Club (AFLW) players
Australian rules footballers from Victoria (Australia)
Sportswomen from Victoria (Australia)
Victorian Women's Football League players